The Nantou County Council (NTCC) is the elected county council of Nantou County, Republic of China. The council composes of 37 councilors lastly elected through the 2022 Republic of China local election on 26 November 2022.

Organization

Committees
 First Review Committee
 Second Review Committee
 Third Review Committee
 Fourth Review Committee

Administrative units
 Chief of Secretary
 Office of Secretariat
 Division of Agenda
 Division of General Affairs
 Division of Public Affairs
 Statue Office
 Accounting Office
 Personnel Office

See also
 Nantou County Government

References

External links

  

County councils of Taiwan
Nantou County